Potrok or POTROK may refer to:

President of the Republic of Korea, the head of state of South Korea
Potrok Aike, a body of water in Argentina